Bay Crest Historic District is a national historic district located at Huntington Bay in Suffolk County, New York.  The district has 21 contributing buildings.  It is a concentrated residential community located along several short, narrow lanes and dated from about 1890 to 1905.

It was added to the National Register of Historic Places in 1985.

References

External links
Bay Crest Historic District Map (Living Places)

National Register of Historic Places in Huntington (town), New York
Colonial Revival architecture in New York (state)
Historic districts in Suffolk County, New York
Historic districts on the National Register of Historic Places in New York (state)